The Wild Horse Range is a mountain range in Elko County, Nevada, United States, northwest of the Owyhee River's Wild Horse Reservoir. It is contained within the Mountain City Ranger District of the Humboldt-Toiyabe National Forest. The range is considered to be a sub-range of the Jarbidge Mountains.

References 

Mountain ranges of Nevada
Mountain ranges of Elko County, Nevada
Humboldt–Toiyabe National Forest